Ignigena is an extinct genus of notoungulate belonging to the family Interatheriidae. The only known species of this genus is Ignigena minisculus. The genus name means born from the fire, referencing the volcanic deposits in which its fossils were found, while the type species name minisculus means "minuscule", referencing the small size of the animal. It was related to Johnbell. I. minisculus was a small animal with elongated teeth. Its fossilized remains were found in Chile, in deposited dating to the Early Eocene.

References

Typotheres
Eocene mammals of South America
Paleogene Chile
Fossils of Chile
Fossil taxa described in 2006
Prehistoric placental genera